Rushden and Higham Town Cricket Club is an amateur cricket club based in Rushden, Northamptonshire, England. Rushden have 3 senior XI teams in the Northamptonshire Cricket League, and an established Junior Section, who compete in the Higham & District Youth League. Rushden also field a Sunday XI team who play friendly matches in and around the region.

Ground
Rushden and Higham Town's First and Second XI teams play their home matches at the Town Ground in Rushden, rated as 'Good' quality ground by the East Northamptonshire Council (ENC). The Town Ground was used by Northamptonshire County Cricket Club for 22 first-class matches between 1924 and 1963, but has been the home ground for Rushden since 2003. The Third XI team use the Saffron Road Recreation Ground, in Higham Ferrers, Rushden, rated as a 'Standard' quality ground by the East Northamptonshire Council.

History
Evidence shows that cricket has been played in Rushden since the middle of the 19th century, with a record of a match being played as early as 1868. One of the earliest known references to a cricket ground was mentioned in a match report dated 1 August 1874, in the Northampton Mercury stating "Pikehills" to be the location and by the 1880s, reports show Rushden Cricket Club winning their second County Challenge Cup in 1884. By 1889, Rushden Cricket Club amalgamated with both the local Football and Rugby club to become the 'Rushden Cricket and Football Club'; and the club moved to their current ground in the same year. By the 1920s Rushden were competing in the Rushden and District League and after the Second World War, they joined the Northamptonshire County League; becoming league champions in 1959 and 1960. Further success was achieved in the Bedford and District Cricket League with the club becoming league champions in 1966. In the 1970s, the club played for the Bedfordshire Millman Trophy and continued competing in the Northants County League up to the turn of the millennium, when the League became a designated ECB Premier League. It was at this time when the club's 120-year-old pavilion was destroyed by fire, along with most of the club's material history in 2000. However, a few years into the millennium saw the club bounce back with the addition of two senior teams (3rd XI side in 2007 and a 4th XI in 2012) and a cluster of division wins leading up to the club becoming Premier League Champions in 2015. After the 2018 season, Rushden Town entered into a merger with its neighbouring club 'Higham Ferrers Town' and became Rushden and Higham Town Cricket Club.

Club Performance
The Northamptonshire Cricket League competition results showing the club's positions in the league (by Division) since 2003.

Club Honours

References

External links 
 Rushden Cricket Club history
 Play Cricket

English club cricket teams
Cricket in Northamptonshire